Infinite In All Directions (1988) is a book on a wide range of subjects, including history, philosophy, research, technology, the origin of life and eschatology, by theoretical physicist Freeman Dyson. The book is based on the author's Gifford Lectures delivered in Aberdeen in 1985. Infinite in All Directions can roughly be summarized as a treatise on the universe and humanity's role and its responsibilities.

References

Essay collections
Works by Freeman Dyson
Gifford Lectures
University of Aberdeen
Harper & Row books
1988 books